Kohistan District may refer to one of the following:

in Afghanistan

 Kohistan District, Badakhshan
 Kohistan District, Faryab
 Kohistan District, Kapisa
 Kohistan Hesa Awal District, a district in Kapisa Province, created within the former Kohistan District
 Kohistan Hesa Duwum District, a district in Kapisa Province, created within the former Kohistan District
in Pakistan

 Kohistan District, Pakistan

District name disambiguation pages

pnb:ضلع کوہستان (فریاب)